Malcolm Frank (born November 5, 1968) is a former Canadian Football League defensive back for the Edmonton Eskimos. He won two Grey Cup championships with Edmonton in 2003 and 2005.

College career
While attending Baylor University, Malcolm Frank was a three-year starter, and finished his career with 5 interceptions, and 131 tackles.

Professional career 
Frank began his pro career with the Orlando Thunder of the WLAF (in 1992), and then two Canadian Football League teams, in 1994 with the Sacramento Gold Miners, and in 1995 with the San Antonio Texans. He later played with the Edmonton Eskimos, from 1996 to 1998, and after a three-year retirement, from 2002 to 2006. He was an all star in 2004. At the end of the 2006 season Frank retired and now resides in Houston, Texas as a successful CB coach for the Channelview Falcons.

References

1968 births
Living people
American football cornerbacks
American players of Canadian football
Baylor Bears football players
Canadian football defensive backs
Edmonton Elks players
Orlando Thunder players
People from Mamou, Louisiana
Sacramento Gold Miners players
San Antonio Texans players
Seattle Seahawks players